Menuet sur le nom d'Haydn is a minuet for solo piano written by Maurice Ravel in 1909 to mark the centenary of Joseph Haydn's death.

Description

The piece is only 54 bars long and lasts for about a minute and a half. The theme is based on Haydn's own name as a five-note motif. The letter H represents B natural, A and D representing their respective pitches, Y as D natural and N as G natural. In the score, the use of this motif is marked using their letters including several inverted and retrograde versions.

History 
This work came about as a result of a commission by the Revue musicale mensuelle de la Société Internationale de Musique. In total, six composers were commissioned: Maurice Ravel, ('Menuet sur le nom d'Haydn'), Claude Debussy ('Hommage à Haydn'), Vincent d'Indy, Paul Dukas ('Prélude Élégiaque'), Reynaldo Hahn ('Theme Varié sur le nom de Haydn'), and Charles-Marie Widor ('Fugue sur le nom d'Haydn').

Each composer was given the same task: to write a piece based on the musical equivalent of Haydn's name.

References

External links

Compositions by Maurice Ravel
1909 compositions
Compositions for solo piano
Funerary and memorial compositions
Music with dedications